Danil Antonovich Kazantsev (born 5 January 2001) is a Russian football player. He plays as a defensive midfielder for FC Khimki and FC Khimki-M.

Club career
He made his Russian Premier League debut for FC Khimki on 25 August 2020 in a game against FC Arsenal Tula. He started the game and was sent-off in the second half for two cautions.

Career statistics

References

External links
 
 
 

2001 births
Sportspeople from Samara Oblast
People from Syzran
Living people
Russian footballers
Association football midfielders
FC Khimki players
Russian Premier League players
Russian Second League players